Chavaragiri is a small rural village in Parappa Taluk in Kasaragod District of Kerala State, India. It comes under Palavayal Village in East Eleri Grama Panchayath. It is located 43 km towards East from Payyanur. The village is approximately 543 km from the State capital Thiruvananthapuram, Kerala.

Transportation
This village is connected to Karnataka state through Panathur. There is a 20 km road from Panathur to Sullia in Karnataka from where Bangalore and Mysore can be easily accessed. Locations in Kerala can be accessed by driving towards the western side. The nearest railway station is Kanhangad railway station on Mangalore-Palakkad line. There are airports at Mangalore and Calicut.

Closest cities, towns and villages   
 Payyanur [42 km]
 Cherupuzha [10 km]
 Chittarikkal [11 km]
 Pulingome [4 km]
 Palavayal [3.5 km]
 Thayyeni  [3 km]

History
After World War II, a large scale migration of people from Central Travancore especially from Meenachil Thaluk (Palai) to Chavaragiri. The migration continued well into the 1970s and 80s. Many of  these migrants were Roman Catholic Christians who had an agricultural background. These  people changed the  agricultural practices to this area. They introduced cash crops like rubber and daily staples like tapioca to this area.

Politics
Chavaragiri is part of the Kasargode Lok Sabha constituency and Trikaripur Assembly Constituency. The main political parties in Chavaragiri are the Indian National Congress, Kerala Congress (M) and CPI(M). CPI(M) member P. Karunakaran is the present MP from Kasargod. M.Rajagopalan, CPI(M) is the sitting MLA of Trikaripur Assembly Constituency.

Institutions
 St.Chvara Church,
 St. Martha Sister's Convent
 Amala Nagar Chapel
 Cultural Centre
 Chavaragiri Traders

Religious places
St.Chvara Church, Chavaragiri , which comes under the Archdiocese of Tellicheri, Kerala. This parish has 138 Catholic families and 760 parishioners. Ward prayer groups, under the guidance of the parish priest and Sisters and  conduct prayer meetings once in a month in each ward. The religious house of St. Martha Sisters here functions along with the parish.

References

External links
Website

Panathur area